The European Commissioner for Financial Stability, Financial Services and the Capital Markets Union is the member of the European Commission responsible for banking and finance. The current officeholder is Mairead McGuinness.

Responsibilities

The post is responsible for the ensuring that financial markets are properly regulated and supervised so that they are stable, competitive and transparent, at the service of jobs and growth. This includes the full implementation of the Banking Union. They are also responsible for establishing a Capital Markets Union by 2019 for all 28 Member States of the EU, and maximising the benefits of capital markets and non-bank financial institutions for the rest of the economy, and in particular SMEs.

In addition, the post is responsible for proposing measures to make financial services work better for consumers and retail investors, and promoting global consistency in regulation and the implementation of agreed standards and principles in cooperation with international partners.

List of Commissioners

See also
 Economy of the European Union
Capital Markets Union
 Eurozone & Euro
 European Central Bank
 European Union Budget
 OLAF
 European Court of Auditors
 Directorate-General for Economic and Financial Affairs

References

External links
 Hill's website
 DG website

Economic and Monetary Affairs
Commissioner Economic
Capital markets of Europe